Pennsylvania Route 568 (PA 568) is an  state route in Berks County in east central Pennsylvania, United States. The western terminus is at U.S. Route 222 (US 222) near Adamstown, where PA 568 continues to the southwest as PA 272. The eastern terminus is at PA 724 in the Robeson Township hamlet of Gibraltar. The route is a two-lane undivided road that passes through rural areas in southern Berks County. The route intersects PA 625 in Knauers, passes through Alleghenyville, and forms a brief concurrency with PA 10 in Green Hills. PA 568 was designated onto its current alignment by 1966. The intersection with US 222 and PA 272 at the western terminus was replaced with an interchange in 2006.

Route description

PA 568 begins at a partial cloverleaf interchange with the US 222 freeway and the northern terminus of PA 272 northeast of the borough of Adamstown in Brecknock Township, Berks County. From this interchange, the route heads east as two-lane undivided Alleghenyville Road, passing through forested areas with some fields and homes. The road continues through rural land and comes to an intersection with PA 625 in the community of Knauers. PA 568 heads southeast through forests with residential subdivisions, reaching the community of Alleghenyville. At this point, the route turns northeast as Kurtz Mill Road and crosses Allegheny Creek, curving east into a mix of farmland, woods, and homes. The road heads northeast into Robeson Township and runs through more rural areas, passing under Interstate 176 without an interchange before coming to the PA 10 junction near Green Hills. At this intersection, PA 568 turns south to briefly run concurrent with PA 10 on Morgantown Road before it splits to the east on Green Hills Road. The road winds to the northeast through forests with some homes and fields. The route follows Allegheny Creek and winds east and then north through more forested areas. PA 568 heads northeast into the residential community of Gibraltar and passes underneath the Schuylkill River Trail and a Norfolk Southern railroad line before it reaches its eastern terminus at PA 724.

History

The present-day alignment of PA 568 was not legislated as part of a route when Pennsylvania first legislated routes in 1911. By 1928, the alignment between Adamstown and Alleghenyville existed as an unpaved road. The roadway between Adamstown and Alleghenyville was paved by 1940. By 1953, the road between Alleghenyville and Gibraltar was paved. PA 568 was designated by 1966 to run from US 222 near Adamstown east to PA 724 in Gibraltar. In 2006, the intersection with US 222 and PA 272 at the western terminus was replaced with an interchange as part of upgrading US 222 to a freeway.

Major intersections

See also

References

External links

Pennsylvania Highways: PA 568

568
Transportation in Berks County, Pennsylvania